The Bombardment of Alexandria in Egypt by the British Mediterranean Fleet took place on 11–13 July 1882.

Admiral Beauchamp Seymour was in command of a fleet of fifteen Royal Navy ironclad ships which had previously sailed to the harbor of Alexandria to support the khedive Tewfik Pasha amid Ahmed 'Urabi's nationalist uprising against his administration and its close ties to British and French financiers. He was joined in the show of force by a French flotilla as well. The move provided some security to the khedive, who withdrew his court to the now-protected port, but strengthened 'Urabi's nationalists within the army and throughout the remainder of Egypt. On 11 June, anti-European riots began in Alexandria. The city's European residents fled and the Egyptian 'Urabist army began fortifying and arming the harbor. An ultimatum to cease this build-up being refused, the British fleet began a 10½-hour bombardment of the city without French assistance. Historians argue about whether Admiral Seymour exaggerated the threat from the Egyptian batteries at Alexandria in order to force the hand of a reluctant Gladstone administration. Once the British had attacked the city, they then proceeded to a full-scale invasion to restore the authority of the khedive. Egypt remained under British influence until 1952, with the last British troops leaving in 1956.

Background (1869–1882)
 In 1869, Khedive Ismail of Egypt inaugurated the Suez Canal, which was a joint venture between the Egyptian Government and the French-led Suez Canal Company. During the excavation of the canal so many Egyptian workers died that it became common in the collective memory of Egyptians to say that Egyptian blood ran in the canal before the water of the seas. The canal cut sailing time from Britain to India by weeks and Britain's interest in Egypt grew.

Due to the excessive spending of the Egyptian Government under the ambitious Khedive, Britain purchased the Khedive's shares of the Suez Canal company in 1875, thus becoming a substantial partner, owning 40% of the total share issue. French and British concern led to the establishment of an Anglo-French Condominium over Egypt which was still nominally under the Ottoman Empire. Egyptian nationalism was sparked and, after a revolt by Egyptian troops in 1881, complete control of the government was held by 'Urabi Pasha by February 1882. The rebellion expressed resentment of foreigners.

'Urabi organized a militia and marched on Alexandria. Meanwhile, the European powers gathered in Constantinople to discuss reestablishing the power of the Khedive and an Anglo-French fleet was ordered to the port of Alexandria. The Egyptians began reinforcing and upgrading their fortifications and the British House of Commons ordered ships to be temporarily dispatched from the Channel Fleet to Malta under Admiral Seymour's command.

By 5 June, six more warships had entered Alexandria harbour and more cruised off the coast. The reasons that the British government sent warships to Alexandria is an object of historical debate, with arguments proposed that it was to protect the Suez Canal and prevent anarchy, and other arguments claiming that it was to protect the interests of British investors with assets in Egypt (see 1882 Anglo-Egyptian War).

The presence of the foreign fleet exacerbated the tensions in Alexandria between the nationalist forces and the large foreign and Christian population. On 11 and 12 June ferocious riots erupted, possibly started by 'Urabi's supporters but also blamed upon the Khedive himself as a false flag operation. Over 50 Europeans and 125 Egyptians were killed in the fracas that began near Place Mehmet Ali with British Admiral Seymour, who was ashore at the time, narrowly escaping the mob. Upon learning of the riot, 'Urabi ordered his forces to restore order.

The reaction by European countries to the disturbance was swift. As refugees fled Alexandria, a flotilla of over 26 ships belonging to most of the countries of Europe gathered in the harbour. By 6 July nearly every non-Egyptian had evacuated Alexandria. Meanwhile, the garrison had continued to fortify the various forts and towers with additional guns until Admiral Seymour issued an ultimatum to 'Urabi's forces to stop fortifying or the British fleet would bombard the city. That same day, the French Admiral Conrad, had informed Seymour that in the event of British bombardment, the French fleet would depart for Port Said and would not participate in the bombardment.

The ultimatum, which was ignored amid denials of the defensive works by the Egyptian governor, was set to expire at 7:00 am on 11 July.

Battle

At daybreak the gun-ship Helicon was dispatched into the harbour flying flags saying she was carrying a message from the Egyptian government to the city defenders.

According to Royle, "[a] steady cannonade was maintained by the attacking and defending forces, and for the next few hours the roar of the guns and the shrieks of passing shot and shell were alone audible." The attack was carried out by the off-shore squadron as it was underway, the ships turning from time to time to keep up the barrage. This was not entirely effective and by 9:40, HMS Sultan, HMS Superb and HMS Alexandra anchored off the Lighthouse Fort and concentrated their now-stationary batteries on Ras El Tin. The fort battery was able to score hits, particularly on Alexandra, but by 12:30, Inflexible had joined the attack and the fort's guns were silenced.

Meanwhile, HMS Temeraire had taken on the Mex Forts (with Invincible splitting its broadsides between Ras El Tin and Mex) and was causing damage to Mex when she grounded on a reef. The gunboat HMS Condor (Beresford) went to her assistance and she was refloated and resumed the attack on the Mex fort. While the off-shore squadron was engaging the forts at long-range, HMS Monarch, HMS Penelope and HMS Condor were ordered into close engagements with the forts at Maza El Kanat and Fort Marabout.

HMS Condor, seeing that Invincible was within range of the guns at Fort Marabout, sailed to within 1,200 feet of the fort and began furiously firing at the fort. When Fort Marabout's guns were disabled, the flagship signaled "Well Done, Condor." The Condors action allowed the ships to finish off Fort Mex.

With the Mex Fort's guns silenced, HMS Sultan signaled to Invincible to attack Fort Adda, which she did with the assistance of Temeraire. At 1:30, a lucky shell from HMS Superb blew up the magazine of Fort Adda, and those batteries ceased firing. At about this time, the British fleet began to run short of ammunition. However, nearly all of the guns from Fort Adda west were silenced. HMS Superb, Inflexible and Temeraire focused their fire on the remaining eastern forts until, at 5:15, the general order to cease fire was issued. The Egyptians, both outmanned and outgunned, had used their firepower to good effect, but the outcome of the bombardment had never been in doubt. The Cairo newspaper El Taif erroneously reported that the Egyptian forts had sunk three ships.

The next day, HMS Temeraire reconnoitered the forts and discovered that the Hospital battery had reconstituted its defences. At 10:30 a.m., Temeraire and Inflexible opened fire, and the battery raised the flag of truce at 10:48 a.m. Very soon an Egyptian boat set out to the flagship bearing the flag of truce, and a cease-fire was ordered. By 2:50 p.m., HMS Bittern signaled that the negotiations had failed and the bombardment was to resume. Still, most of the forts flew white flags and an irregular cannonade by the British fleet began.

By 4:00 p.m. a fire had broken out on shore, and by evening the fire had engulfed the wealthiest quarter of Alexandria, the area predominantly inhabited by Europeans. The fire raged for the next two days before it burned itself out. Admiral Seymour, unsure of the situation in the city, didn't land any troops to take control of the city or fight the fire. It was not until 14 July that British marines and sailors landed in Alexandria.

Aftermath
It has been estimated that as many as 30 percent of the shells fired by the Royal Navy missed their targets and landed in the city itself, causing death and injury among the inhabitants, damaging or destroying many buildings, and starting fires which spread over the following days. This damage was exacerbated by panic, looting and arson, while many buildings rendered unsafe by the bombardment were subsequently demolished by the British during their occupation.

British sailors and marines landed and attempted to take control of the blackened ruins of the city and prevent the looting, while propping up the Khedive's shaky government. Eventually order was restored, and a month later General Garnet Wolseley landed a large force of British troops in Alexandria as a staging location for attacking 'Urabi near the Suez Canal at the Battle of Tell El Kebir.

Photographer Luigi Fiorillo created an album of fifty pages showing the changes in Alexandria from start to finish of this attack. These photos can now be found online at The American University of Cairo in the Rare Books and Special Collections Digital Library. This digital library was established in the fall of 2011 and the photographs of the Bombardment of Alexandria were compiled between June and August 2012.

The bombardment was described in disparaging terms by British MP Henry Richard:

I find a man prowling about my house with obviously felonious purposes. I hasten to get locks and bars, and to barricade my windows. He says that is an insult and threat to him, and he batters down my doors, and declares that he does so only as an act of strict self-defence.

After that the Urabi revolt was put down. Egypt came under partial British military occupation and significant governmental supervision (including as an outright British Protectorate 1914-22; British Protectorate) and remained under British domination through the Second World War.

British Fleet

Battleships
 HMS Alexandra
 HMS Superb
 HMS Sultan
 HMS Temeraire
 HMS Inflexible
 HMS Monarch
 HMS Invincible
 HMS Penelope

Torpedo boat

Despatch boat

Gunvessels

Egyptian forts
 Citadel of El Max
 Citadel of Qaitbay
 Fort Adda
 Fort Agami
 Fort Kamaria
 Fort Marabout
 Fort Omuk Kebebe
 Fort Ras El Tin
 Fort Saleh Aga
 Fort Silsileh
 Marza El Kana

See also
 List of conflicts in the Near East

References

Bibliography

Further reading

 
 
 

Alexandria
Alexandria
Military history of Alexandria
Alexandria
1882 in Egypt
19th-century military history of the United Kingdom
July 1882 events
19th century in Alexandria